Francesco Paolantoni (born   3 March 1956) is an Italian film, stage and television actor and comedian.

Born in Naples, Paolantoni studied acting at the Accademia Nazionale di Arte Drammatica Silvio D'Amico in Rome, then he started a career as a dramatic stage actor in the late 1970s.  In 1987 he debuted as a comedian in Renzo Arbore's variety show Indietro tutta, but the real success came in 1996, with Gialappa's Band's Mai dire Gol and later with the participation in Quelli che... il Calcio.  He was also active in films, in which he worked with Paolo Virzì, Mario Martone, Cristina Comencini and Sabina Guzzanti, among others.

References

External links 
 

Italian male film actors
1956 births
Male actors from Naples
Italian male television actors
Italian male stage actors
Living people
Accademia Nazionale di Arte Drammatica Silvio D'Amico alumni